Ulignano is a village in Tuscany, central Italy, administratively a frazione of the comune of San Gimignano, province of Siena. At the time of the 2001 census its population was 688.

Ulignano is about 40 km from Siena and 8 km from San Gimignano.

References 

Frazioni of San Gimignano